LIN Media was an American holding company founded in 1994 that operated 43 television stations. All except one were affiliates of the six major U.S. television networks. One of the remaining stations was a low powered weather station in Indiana.

LIN Media's chief executive officer was Vincent L. Sadusky. Sadusky had been LIN's chief financial officer, Vice President and treasurer since 2004, and had been CFO for Telemundo, working closely on its sale to GE/NBC. Sadusky had been interim CEO since former chairman Gary R. Chapman announced his impending retirement in June 2006, and through the company's search for a permanent replacement. He was installed as CEO upon Chapman's retirement on July 10, 2006.

History

LIN TV's roots trace back to the founding of its former parent, LIN Broadcasting Corporation, in 1961. LIN Broadcasting was engaged in radio, television, direct marketing, information and learning, music publishing, and record labels.  LIN takes its initials from three major cities where it originally owned radio stations:  Louisville, Indianapolis and Nashville (all located on Interstate 65). The company purchased its first television station, WTVP (now WAND) in Decatur, Illinois, at the end of 1965. It also briefly owned the catalogues of King Records and Starday Records in the early 1970s.

LIN Broadcasting made acquisitions in broadcasting, expanded into paging, and in the early 1980s the company entered the fledgling cellular telephone business. By 1983 the company owned seven television stations and by 1985 it owned and managed cellular telephone licenses serving Dallas, Houston, Los Angeles, New York City, and Philadelphia. LIN Broadcasting sold its paging operations and six of its radio stations in 1986 to help finance the development of its cellular business.

In March 1990, McCaw Cellular Communications purchased a 52% interest in LIN Broadcasting. McCaw was acquired by AT&T in 1994, after which LIN Broadcasting's television operations were spun off as a public company traded on the NASDAQ stock market and 45%-owned by AT&T. The new company, LIN Television Corporation, owned and/or operated 12 stations and its stock price increased at a compounded annual growth rate of 31% between 1994 and 1998. During this period LIN acquired WIVB-TV in Buffalo, New York and WTNH in New Haven, Connecticut.

In March 1998, LIN TV was acquired by Hicks, Muse, Tate & Furst, a leading private investment firm based in Dallas, Texas. At the time of the HMTF acquisition, LIN contributed its Dallas NBC affiliate, KXAS-TV, to a joint venture with the network that also held the San Diego affiliate (KNSD). Under HMTFs ownership, LIN Television has grown considerably through a wide range of transactions:

In June 1999, LIN TV acquired WOOD-TV in Grand Rapids, Michigan. Former parent LIN Broadcasting had owned the station from 1983 to 1994, when it merged with AT&T. However, LIN TV had continued to operate it.

In August, LIN TV helped finance the establishment of the now-defunct Banks Broadcasting, a minority-owned television broadcast company in which it held a 50% interest. Banks owned two stations – both of which became CW network affiliates under Banks: KWCV (now KSCW-DT) in Wichita, Kansas and KNIN-TV in Boise, Idaho (the latter has since switched its network affiliation to Fox).

LIN TV purchased WAPA-TV in San Juan, Puerto Rico in October. In April 2000, LIN TV acquired WLFI-TV, serving West Lafayette, Indiana as well as Lafayette, Indiana in exchange for 66% of WAND. LIN continued to provide management oversight for WAND for several years after the swap was completed.

LIN TV purchased WWLP in Springfield, Massachusetts in 2000. In 2001, LIN TV acquired WJPX and two satellite facilities in Puerto Rico, and the secondary commercial license of PBS member station WNEQ in Buffalo from the Western New York Public Broadcasting Association, re-launching it as commercial station WNLO.

The company exercised and closed on options to purchase WOTV in Battle Creek, Michigan and WVBT in Norfolk, Virginia, both stations that it had already managed, in January 2002.

In February, LIN TV agreed to acquire seven stations in six markets from Sunrise Television. The transaction of the stations was completed in May. Also in May, LIN TV completed the issuance of 19.55 million shares of Class A Common Stock through its initial public offering on the New York Stock Exchange.

In December 2002, LIN TV announced the sale of two television stations in Abilene and San Angelo, Texas. This was followed in January 2004 by the sale of a station in Flint, Michigan.

In February 2005, LIN TV announced purchase of two UPN stations WWHO in Columbus and WNDY in Indianapolis from Viacom. In late August 2005, LIN TV purchased several stations from Emmis Communications: the stations purchased were WALA-TV and WBPG (now WFNA) in Mobile, Alabama, WTHI-TV in Terre Haute, Indiana, KRQE in Albuquerque, New Mexico, and WLUK-TV in Green Bay, Wisconsin. In July 2006, LIN announced the planned purchase a second station in New Mexico, KASA-TV, from Raycom Media.

In May 2006, LIN TV announced the sale of Puerto Rico stations WAPA-TV and WJPX to InterMedia Partners for $130 million.

In November 2007, LIN TV completed the sale of its share of WAND to Block Communications. With this sale, LIN TV no longer manages the station.

On October 3, 2008, LIN TV's stations were dropped from Time Warner Cable, due to a dispute over "retransmission fees." LIN's stations returned to Time Warner on October 29, 2008.

Also during Fall 2008, LIN TV and Fox Interactive Media developed a new Web CMS platform which would initially host the Web sites of all of the stations owned by LIN TV and those owned by Fox Television Stations. This division would be spun off in 2009 as the independent company Canvas Technology, which would change its name to EndPlay in 2010. With Fox Television Stations abandoning the EndPlay platform in favor of WorldNow during 2012, LIN TV will become EndPlay's largest client, followed by the E. W. Scripps Company (which adopted the EndPlay platform during 2010).

On August 7, 2009, LIN TV introduced mobile TV BlackBerry service on six of its stations, with plans for 27 more stations to be added. The strategy accompanies a 20 percent second-quarter revenue decline at the same time digital revenue has risen 52 percent.

On October 6, 2009, LIN TV acquired RM Media, an online advertising and media services startup based in Austin. RM Media connects targeted audiences with advertisers and publishers based on demographic, psychographic and consumer behaviors to enhance branding and maximize client return on investment. RM Media developed extensive proprietary technology including a consumer- and advertiser-friendly video player, a top 35 comScore display ad network, a highly effective Search Engine Optimization and Search Engine Marketing process, and acquired and integrated two companies that specialize in web development and lead generation, launched two top 100 comScore proprietary websites and services several Fortune 500 clients.

A rebranding to LIN Media was announced on April 13, 2010; although the corporate name remained LIN TV Corporation, the new name emphasized the company's Internet and mobile interests.

On June 4, 2010, LIN TV reached a deal with ACME Communications on a shared services agreement involving ACME and LIN-owned stations in the Green Bay, Dayton, and Albuquerque markets. LIN TV would then provide technical, engineering, promotional, administrative and other operational support services for ACME's CW stations, as well as provide advertising sales services under a related but separate joint sales agreement. This was followed on September 2 by the announcement that LIN would be acquiring two of the ACME stations, WBDT in Dayton, Ohio and WIWB in Green Bay, Wisconsin. WIWB, which has since taken the new calls WCWF, would become owned by LIN outright while WBDT would be technically owned by Vaughan Media but controlled by LIN who would hold an ownership stake in that company.  The FCC approved the sales of WBDT and WCWF in April 2011.

On March 4, 2011, LIN TV's contract with Dish Network expired, and all 31 LIN TV affiliated stations were pulled from local Dish Network broadcasts. LIN TV initially demanded a price increase of 140% from Dish Network, a number that skyrocketed to 175% after the contract expired.  The channels returned to Dish Network on March 13, 2011. In 2011, LIN sold WWHO to Manhan Media, who entered into an SSA with Sinclair Broadcast Group, owners of WSYX and operators of WTTE, the deal was finalized in February 2012.

2012: New Vision acquisition, NBC sale 
On May 7, 2012, LIN TV announced that it will acquire the 13 television stations owned by New Vision Television for $330.4 million and the assumption of $12 million in debt. The agreement includes operational control of three stations currently owned by PBC Broadcasting involved in shared service agreements with New Vision-owned stations in three markets. The three PBC-owned stations (KTKA-TV in Topeka, Kansas, WTGS in Savannah, Georgia and WYTV in Youngstown, Ohio) were sold to Vaughan Media, but are operated by LIN TV under shared service agreements. The transaction was finalized on October 12.

On February 13, 2013, LIN TV announced that it would be re-organized into a new company, LIN Media, LLC. Also on that date, LIN pulled out of its Station Venture Operations joint venture with NBCUniversal, giving NBC 100% ownership of KNSD and KXAS-TV. LIN paid NBC around $100 million to allow for the transaction. The re-organization was completed on July 30.

2014: Media General merger 
On March 21, 2014, LIN announced that it would sell itself to Media General, in a transaction described as a "merger". The deal, worth an estimated $1.6 billion, would create an entity of 71 stations (adjusted for side deals and divestitures) that would reach approximately 24% of U.S. television households. In order to comply with FCC ownership rules as well as planned changes to rules regarding same-market television stations which would prohibit future joint sales agreements, Media General and LIN will divest and swap stations that both companies own in Birmingham, Green Bay, Mobile, Providence and Savannah. The companies swapped WTGS, WJAR, WLUK, and WCWF to Sinclair Broadcast Group in exchange for KXRM, KXTU, WHTM, and WTTA. Hearst Television acquired WJCL and WVTM, and Meredith Corporation acquired WALA (Meredith later merged with Gray Television).

The deal was approved by shareholders on October 6, 2014, and by the FCC on December 12, 2014. The merger was completed on December 19. Although the combined company adopted the Media General name, the company was taken over by the principal staff of LIN, including CEO Vincent Sadusky, who replaced Media General's CEO George Mahoney post-merger. In total, 45 Media General staff members were laid off as part of the merger.

On January 11, 2017, the FCC approved the sale of Media General to Nexstar Broadcasting Group; the sale was completed on January 17.

Infomercials
The defunct LIN Media featured the same or similar informercial format with localized titles on many of its stations:
 on WLUK-TV in Green Bay, Wisconsin it was known as Living with Amy
 while on WNAC-TV in Providence, Rhode Island it branded their program The Rhode Show
 in Norfolk, Virginia station WVBT it titled their program The Hampton Roads Show

These two programs remained in production following LIN's merger with the broadcast unit of Media General in 2014 (and as of 2017, with LIN/Media General forerunner Nexstar Media Group), while Living with Amy remains in production following WLUK's sale to Sinclair Broadcast Group in 2014 due to market concentration concerns.

Former LIN-owned stations
Stations are arranged alphabetically by state and by city of license.

Notes:
 (**) – Indicates that it was built and signed on by LIN.
 (≈≈) – Indicates a station owned by Sunrise Television prior to its acquisition by LIN in 2002.
 (++) – Indicates a station acquired by LIN from Emmis Communications in 2005. KHON, KOIN, KSNT & KSNW were acquired by Montecito Broadcast Group in 2006. These stations would eventually be acquired by LIN in 2012. 
 (¤¤) – Indicates a station owned by New Vision Television prior to its acquisition by LIN in 2012.

Notes:
1 Through Station Venture Operations, LIN kept 24% ownership of these stations from 1998 to 2013. LIN did not manage these stations, and for all intents and purposes they were NBC owned-and-operated stations. Both stations are now wholly owned by NBCUniversal outright.
2 Owned by Vaughan Media, LIN operated the stations through a local marketing agreement.
3 LIN kept 33% ownership of WAND from 2000 to 2007.
4 Owned by Tamer Media, LLC, LIN operated the stations through a shared services agreement.
5 Owned by Super Towers, LIN operated WNAC through a local marketing agreement.

LIN TV also used to hold a 50% share in Banks Broadcasting, which owned two stations:
 KNIN-TV 9 Boise, Idaho (formerly UPN) (now a Fox affiliate owned by Gray Television and operated by the E. W. Scripps Company; was affiliated with The CW from 2006 to 2011)
 KWCV 33 Wichita, Kansas (formerly WB) (now The CW affiliate KSCW-DT owned by Gray Television)

References

External links

Companies formerly listed on the New York Stock Exchange
Defunct broadcasting companies of the United States
Mass media companies established in 1994
Mass media companies disestablished in 2014
Companies formerly listed on the Nasdaq
Nexstar Media Group
2014 mergers and acquisitions